Walter Noel Greaza (pronounced Gree-zay; January 1, 1897 – June 1, 1973) was an American television, radio, stage and film actor.

Biography
Greaza was born on January 1, 1897, in St Paul, Minnesota, to Albert Edward Greaza and Mary Elizabeth Frickelton. He studied business law and political science at the University of Minnesota in addition to acting with the university's drama organization. During World War I, he served in the U.S. Navy.

Greaza was appointed national administrative chairman of the American Guild of Variety Artists in 1942 and was assistant executive secretary of Actors Equity in 1943.

In 1948 he married Helene Ambrose. They remained wed until her death in 1966.

Greaza was president of The Lambs from 1953 to 1956.

Greaza died at the Kew Gardens General Hospital on June 1, 1973 from cardiac arrest.

Appearances
Greaza appeared in 8 films and 10 television programs between 1946 and 1965. His first film was The Story of Kenneth W. Randall, M.D. (1946) and his career ended with an episode in the television series The Defenders (1965).

On Broadway, Greaza appeared in Roman Candle (1960), Auntie Mame (1956), Temper the Wind (1946), The Overtons (1946), The Visitor (1944), Wallflower (1944), A New Life(1943), The Red Velvet Goat (1939), Sunup to Sundown (1938), To Quito and Back (1937), Sea Legs (1937), Now You've Done It (1937), All Editions (1936), Arrest That Woman (1936), If This Be Treason (1935), Ceiling Zero (1935), But Not For Love (1934), Judgment Day (1934), Wednesday's Child (1934), We, The People (1933), In Times Square (1931), Enemy Within (1931), and Love in the Tropics (1927).

Greaza's film credits include: 13 Rue Madeleine (1947), Call Northside 777 (1948), The Street with No Name (1948), New Mexico (1951), and It Happened to Jane (1959).

On television, Greaza starred as The chief on Treasury Men in Action (1950–55) and portrayed Winston Grimsley on The Edge of Night (from 1956 until his death). His other TV credits include: The Philco Television Playhouse (1949), Martin Kane, Private Eye (1951), Hallmark Hall of Fame (1956), The Phil Silvers Show (1958), and The United States Steel Hour (1961–62).

On radio, Greaza starred as Steve Wilson in Big Town. He also played Inspector Ross on Crime Doctor, and Russ in Lora Lawton and had supporting roles in The FBI in Peace and War.

Filmography

References

External links

Male actors from Minnesota
American male film actors
American male television actors
1897 births
1973 deaths
20th-century American male actors
The Lambs presidents
University of Minnesota alumni
American male radio actors
American male stage actors